Leslie Fernandes (16 May 1938 – 29 April 1977) was a Guyanese cricketer. He played in one first-class match for British Guiana in 1960/61.

See also
 List of Guyanese representative cricketers

References

External links
 

1938 births
1977 deaths
Guyanese cricketers
Guyana cricketers
Sportspeople from Georgetown, Guyana